There are numerous film adaptations of Edmond Rostand's play Cyrano de Bergerac:

 Cyrano de Bergerac (1900 film), a French production starring Benoît-Constant Coquelin
 Cyrano de Bergerac (1925 film), starring Pierre Magnier
 Cyrano de Bergerac (1938 film), a live television adaptation starring James Mason and Leslie Banks
 Cyrano de Bergerac (1946 film), a French production starring Claude Dauphin
 Cyrano de Bergerac (1950 film), starring José Ferrer
 Cyrano de Bergerac (1962 film), starring Christopher Plummer
 Cyrano de Bergerac (1968 film), BBC Play of the Month, starring Eric Porter
 Cyrano de Bergerac (1974 film), starring Peter Donat
 Cyrano de Bergerac (1985 film), starring Derek Jacobi
 Cyrano de Bergerac (1990 film), a French production starring Gérard Depardieu
 Cyrano de Bergerac (2008 film), starring Kevin Kline
 Cyrano (2021 film), an American-British musical drama directed by Joe Wright

Derivative versions 
 Love Letters (1945 film), screenplay by Ayn Rand
 Aru kengo no shogai (Life of an Expert Swordsman) (1959),  starring Toshirō Mifune, adapted by director Hiroshi Inagaki
 Roxanne (film) (1987), directed by Fred Schepisi, starring Steve Martin
 The Truth About Cats & Dogs (1996), starring Uma Thurman
 Whatever It Takes (2000 film), starring James Franco
 Bigger Than the Sky (2005), in which the protagonist auditions for a local community theater production of Cyrano de Bergerac, and the movie plays out with it as the background theme
 Cyrano Agency (2010), a Korean romance-comedy of a group of actors and stage experts working as professional love makers by writing monologues, staging scenarios and directing their clients
 Megamind (2010), animated film by DreamWorks, inspired by the story and re-imagining the characters in a superhero and supervillain format, with the titular Megamind as Cyrano
 Let It Shine (2012), a Disney Channel Original Movie loosely based on the story. 
 Oohalu Gusagusalade (2014), a Telugu adaptation, written and directed by Srinivas Avasarala
 Sierra Burgess Is a Loser (2018), a gender reversed Netflix Original based loosely on the story
 #Roxy (2018)
 The Most Beautiful Girl in the World (2018), a German movie re-imagining the characters as students in modern times.
 The Half of It (2020), another Netflix Original that has Cyrano as a girl, Roxanne as a girl, and Christian as a boy
 Duet (1994) - Indian movie in which two brothers love the same woman. The older brother is a talented saxophone player albeit overweight which results in his reluctance to express his love openly

See also 
 Start-Up (South Korean TV series) (2020), loosely based on the story
 Cyrano de Bergerac, the real-life person on whom the play is loosely based

References 

Lists of works based on plays